The men's decathlon at the 2018 Commonwealth Games, as part of the athletics programme, took place in the Carrara Stadium on 9 and 10 April 2018.

Records
Prior to this competition, the existing world and Games records were as follows:

Schedule
The schedule was as follows:

All times are Australian Eastern Standard Time (UTC+10)

Event results
Competitors contested a series of 10 events over two days, with their results being converted into points. The final standings were decided by their cumulative points tallies.

100 metres
Results after event 1 of 10:

Long jump
Results after event 2 of 10:

Shot put
Results after event 3 of 10:

High jump
Results after event 4 of 10:

400 metres
Results after event 5 of 10:

110 metres hurdles
Results after event 6 of 10:

Discus throw
Results after event 7 of 10:

Pole vault
Results after event 8 of 10:

Javelin throw
Results after event 9 of 10:

1500 metres 
Results after event 10 of 10:

Standings
The highest mark recorded in each event is highlighted in yellow with a diamond symbol.

The final standings were as follows:

References

Men's decathlon
2018